The Horn Sonata in E minor, Op. 44 (Also known as the Sonata Concertante, Op. 44.) is a composition by Franz Danzi published by Breitkopf & Härtel in 1814, after being advertised by the publisher in late 1813.

Background

Like the earlier horn sonata, the precise details of this composition's creation are not known, though it may have been the response to the publication in 1812 of a horn sonata by virtuoso pianist Nikolaus von Krufft.

Instrumentation

As with the Horn Sonata, Op. 28, the work was first published scored for piano and natural horn with the possibility of a cello being substituted for the horn in performance. In more recent years the valve horn has been substituted for the natural horn in performance. As in the earlier work the piano is the dominant instrument, with the horn in an essentially acommpanying role, albeit with opportunities to share in the melodic material.

Structure

The composition is in three movements:

 Allegro
 Larghetto
 Allegretto

A typical performance takes around 22 minutes.

References
Notes

Sources

External links

Compositions by Franz Danzi
Danzi
1814 compositions
Compositions in E minor